Nichelle D. Tramble Spellman (born February 11, 1967) is an American television producer and writer.

Career 
In 2017, Spellman, and her husband, Malcolm Spellman began to co-produce and co-write an alternate history television series for Home Box Office, called Confederate, set in a present day America where slavery remained legal.  The pair found themselves called upon to explain how African-American producers could be involved in a show focused around slavery.

She has worked as a writer or producer on The Good Wife, Justified, Mercy, Harper's Island and Women's Murder Club.

Nichelle Tramble Spellman is the creator and showrunner of the Apple TV+ drama series Truth Be Told, starring Octavia Spencer, Aaron Paul, Lizzy Caplan, Elizabeth Perkins, Ron Cephas Jones, Mekhi Phifer, Michael Beach, Tracie Thoms, and Annabella Sciorra. The limited series is inspired by the 2017 novel Are You Sleeping.

Truth Be Told debuted on Apple TV+ on December 6, 2019. In February 2020, Spellman won the NAACP Image Award for Outstanding Writing in a Dramatic Series for "Monster", the first episode of the series.

Spellman is also the author of the novels The Dying Ground and The Last King, published by Random House/Ballantine.

Filmography

Awards and nominations

References

External links 
 

American television producers
American television writers
American women screenwriters
American women television writers
American women television producers
1967 births
Living people
21st-century American women